The Law of Egypt consists of courts, offences, and various types of laws. Egypt has its own constitution which took effect on 18 January 2014. The Constitution of Egypt is the fundamental law of the country. Egypts legal codes and court operations are based primarily on British, Italian, and Napoleonic models, and has been the inspiration for the civil code for numerous other Middle Eastern jurisdictions, including Jordan, Bahrain, Qatar, pre-dictatorship kingdoms of Libya and Iraq, and the commercial code of Kuwait.

Egyptian Civil Code 

The Egyptian Civil Code is the primary source of civil law for Egypt, governing "the areas of personal rights, contracts, obligations, and torts.". The first version of Egyptian Civil Code was written in 1949 containing 1149 articles.

There are "two levels" of litigation (two trials of fact)" with another appellate level in civil litigation in Egypt. 
"Small claims cases are tried before a single judge, with a right to de novo appeal to a panel of three judges from the Court of First Instance." 
"Larger claims originate with a panel of three Court of First Instance judges, with a right of de novo appeal to a three-judge panel of Court of Appeals judges. Appeals from the Court of Appeals are limited to legal issues, and are conducted before the Court of Cassation, which is the highest court of Egypt's common court system." according to EgyptJustice.com. 

Unlike Saudi Arabia and some other Muslim countries, the Egyptian legal system has no office of hisbah (Islamic religious police force), but it does allows for "hisbah" lawsuits.

Judiciary of Egypt 

The judicial system (or judicial branch) of Egypt is an independent branch of the Egyptian government which includes both secular and religious courts. The Judiciary of Egypt consists of administrative and non-administrative courts, a Supreme Constitutional Court, penal courts, civil and commercial courts, personal status and family courts, national security courts, labour courts, military courts, and other specialized courts or circuits.

The criminal code listed three main categories of crime: contraventions (minor offenses), misdemeanors (offenses punishable by imprisonment or fines), and felonies (offenses punishable by penal servitude or death).

See also
 Cairo Declaration on Human Rights in Islam
 Application of sharia law by country
 Egyptian Judges' Club
 Egyptian nationality law
 Egyptian NGO Law

Bibliography
Bechor, Guy. The Sanhuri Code, and the Emergence of Modern Arab Civil Law (1932 To 1949), (2007), . 
Hoyle, Mark, The Mixed Courts of Egypt, (1991), .

References

External links
Hans W. Baade, Transplants of Laws and of Lawyers, University of Texas colloquia paper
Mohamed Mattar, Islamic Law, Common Law, and Civil Law: The Place of Islamic Law in the Legal Family
Anne E. Mayer, Modern Law: Varieties in Legal Systems in Middle Eastern Countries
 Egypt, Arab Republic of